Andrés Sebastián Soria Quintana (born 8 November 1983) commonly known as Sebastián Soria, is a Uruguayan-born, naturalized Qatari professional footballer who plays as a striker for Qatar SC and the Qatar national team. He was shortlisted for the Asian Footballer of the Year award in 2008. He currently holds the record for the fastest goal scored in AFC Champions League history at 9 seconds – a record which was set in 2013 when he was playing for Lekhwiya.

Club career

Early career
As a youngster, Soria had an unsuccessful trial at Uruguayan club Defensor Sporting in Montevideo.

Soria continued playing in the minor leagues and a new chance soon emerged. In 2001, a cyclist, who had watched Soria playing in the minor leagues and was impressed by his talents, brought him to the attention of a football agent he knew, and Soria was sent to Montevideo to play in Liverpool de Montevideo, where he played under coach Julio Ribas. He was sent to the reserve team for a brief while before making it back on the first team. He eventually proved his value and ended up playing the rest of the 2003 season on the first team.

In mid-2004, Soria got an offer from Frenchman Bruno Metsu to play for Al-Gharafa in Qatar. He had to look Qatar up on a map as he was unsure of where it was located. Nevertheless, he accepted the proposal despite the geographical uncertainty. He arrived in Qatar in 2004 and was naturalized in 2006.

Club Career Stats

Al Gharafa
Soria joined Al Gharafa in 2004 under the supervision of Bruno Metsu. It was the first time he had played outside of Uruguay. He won the 2004–05 Qatar Stars League with Al Gharafa.

Qatar SC
Soria transferred to Qatar SC from league winners Al Gharafa in 2005. He won the Qatar Crown Prince Cup with the club in 2009. He attracted interest from Europe, with Italian team Udinese and Spanish capital sides Getafe and Atletico Madrid scouting him. However, he chose to extend his contract with Qatar SC in 2010.

AC Milan vs Al Sadd
When AC Milan came to visit Doha in March 2009, in a farewell match for Jafal Rashed Al-Kuwari, Soria guested for Al Sadd. "They invited me to play for Al Sadd, so of course I said yes. I like to play against the strong defenders," Soria said after his scuffles with Milan defender Philippe Senderos. After being substituted, Soria was swarmed by local fans and patiently signed autographs for approximately 15 minutes.

Lekhwiya
After transferring to Qatari champions Lekhwiya, Soria had the opportunity to play in the 2013 AFC Champions League. He scored 4 goals in Lekhwiya's first four group stage games, including one of the fastest goals in any Asian competition after 9 seconds against Pakhtakor on 9 April 2013. It was alleged to be the fastest goal in Asia's premier continental club competition during the AFC Champions League format.

Al Rayyan
Soria joined Al-Rayyan SC on a one-year deal in 2015.

International career

Soria was born and raised in Paysandú, but moved to Qatar early in his footballing career and became a naturalized citizen. He won a gold medal in the 2006 Asian Games for the Qatar U-23 team. The official Qatar SC website has him listed as being born in 1984. In addition, QFA's website lists his actual date of birth as 1983.

Soria saved the Qatari national team by scoring in the last 20 minutes, which helped tie the score. This happened in the AFC 2007 in both their games, one against Japan, and the other just recently against Vietnam. He also scored the leading goal against the United Arab Emirates. He is the only Qatari player to score on the 2007 Asian Cup. He scored three goals.

Soria scored a goal against eventual winners Japan in the 2011 Asian Cup quarterfinals but the homeside were silenced after a late goal from Inoha put Japan in the lead to win by a 3–2 victory. However, he was not included in Djamel Belmadi's squad for 2015 AFC Asian Cup.

International career statistics
.

 Notes: Values between brackets refer to matches/goals which are not considered full A-internationals.

International goals
Scores and results list Qatar's goal tally first.

Honours

Club
Al Gharafa
Qatar Stars League: 2004–05
Sheikh Jassem Cup: 2005

Qatar SC
Qatar Crown Prince Cup: 2009

Lekhwiya
Qatar Stars League: 2013–14, 2014–15
Qatar Cup: 2013, 2015

Al Rayyan
Qatar Stars League: 2015–16

Individual
QFA Player of the Season: 2005–06
Asian Footballer of the Year nominee: 2008
Qatar Stars League Top Scorer: 2012–13

See also 
 List of men's footballers with 100 or more international caps

References

External links

Al Jazeera English Interview: Sebastian Soria

1983 births
Living people
Qatari footballers
Qatar international footballers
Uruguayan footballers
Footballers from Paysandú
Naturalised citizens of Qatar
Qatari people of Uruguayan descent
Liverpool F.C. (Montevideo) players
Qatar SC players
Al-Gharafa SC players
Lekhwiya SC players
Al-Rayyan SC players
Al-Arabi SC (Qatar) players
2007 AFC Asian Cup players
2011 AFC Asian Cup players
Qatar Stars League players
Association football forwards
Asian Games medalists in football
Footballers at the 2006 Asian Games
FIFA Century Club
Asian Games gold medalists for Qatar
Medalists at the 2006 Asian Games